Estate Perseverance, near Charlotte Amalie on Saint Thomas in the U.S. Virgin Islands, was listed on the National Register of Historic Places in 1978.

The earliest available record shows it was owned by a Mrs. Mary Fogerty in 1811.

It once had a timber hipped roof. It includes Classical Revival details.

References

Sugar plantations
National Register of Historic Places in the United States Virgin Islands
Buildings and structures completed in 1811
West End, Saint Thomas, U.S. Virgin Islands